Northwestern Polytechnic (NWP), formerly known as Grande Prairie Regional College (GPRC) is a community college in northwestern Alberta, Canada. The college's main campus is located in Grande Prairie, with a secondary campus in Fairview, and many of its courses are offered online. The college offers a number of apprenticeship and academic programs including certificates and diplomas, university studies, academic upgrading, and workforce development courses in various subjects. NWP is a member of the Alberta Rural Development Network.

History
Northwestern Polytechnic was opened as the Grande Prairie Junior College in 1966. In 1970, the college was renamed to Grande Prairie Regional College. In 1974, classes were first started in a new facility designed by Canadian architect Douglas Cardinal. In 1991, phase two of the college, designed by architects Field, Field, and Field, was officially opened.

In 2015, NWP announced a cut in budget of over $5 million with presidents and vice presidents donating 5% of their salaries.  The college eliminated 22 positions. In 2018, the government of Alberta announced plans to make NWP a university. NWP responded that this was "the right decision" and that it "has been striving for since it opened 50 years ago".

In January of 2020, the province of Alberta announced new performance based funding model for colleges and universities. In March, NWP announced significant budget reductions.  A few months later in May, NWP eliminated 85 staff positions and 2 programs.  Later that month, the government of Alberta announced that NWP would not become a university, and move toward polytechnic status instead.  In August 2021, NWP appointed another new president, the third in under five months. On December 9, 2021, the government of Alberta approved a name change for the institution, and it is now officially Northwestern Polytechnic.

Academic programs

Collaborative programs with other institutions such as the University of Alberta allow students to complete some bachelor's degrees at NWP, including the Bachelor of Science – Agriculture. Other degree programs require transferring to another institution to complete their degree after studying at the college.  Some arrangements also allow for a student to start studies at another facility and complete their degree program at the college.  In total, over 20 different routes for university studies are offered, and some degrees can be completed at the College.

The college offers over 15 certificate and diploma programs. Certificate programs usually require students to complete two semesters of courses, while diploma programs usually require four.

Academic upgrading is also offered, which allows individuals to pursue other learning opportunities such as Grade 12 equivalency and general studies.

Northwestern Polytechnic has an International Education Centre which offers students courses in English as a second language (ESL).  Foreign students can also take credit-based college and university courses offered to Canadian residents.

Northwestern Polytechnic’s Continuing Education (Workforce Development) offers courses to the general public in a number of areas. Courses primarily focus on personal and professional development, and range from one-day courses to full credit programs.

Northwestern Polytechnic’s Fairview Campus offers the only authorized training centre in Canada for Harley-Davidson motorcycles.

Athletics program
 
Northwestern Polytechnic’s athletic program holds membership in both the Alberta Colleges Athletics Conference and Canadian Collegiate Athletics Association. Student-athletes compete as the NWP Wolves, and as of the 2021-22 season, consisted of over 100 athletes competing in eight teams over five sports, including cross country running, basketball, indoor track, soccer and volleyball.

The Cross Country Running program is NWP's most successful athletic program winning 3 CCAA individual gold medals and 2 individual silver medals. The women's cross country team captured the CCAA national team title in 2014 with the best team score in CCAA history - 19 points.

The Wolves Men's Volleyball team carries a strong tradition of winning in the ACAC and has received 2 silver and one bronze medal at CCAA Nationals.

Scholarships and bursaries
The Government of Canada sponsors an Aboriginal Bursaries Search Tool that lists over 680 scholarships, bursaries, and other incentives offered by governments, universities, and industry to support Aboriginal post-secondary participation. NWP scholarships for Indigenous, First Nations and Métis students include: TransCanada Award for Aboriginal Student; BP Canada Energy Company Scholarship For An Aboriginal Student; ATCO Electric Bursary for an Aboriginal Student; Grande Prairie Regional College Financial Aid; TransAlta Aboriginal Educational Awards  The Jordan B. Peterson Scholarship is offered to students, named for the former GPRC alumnus.

Campus facilities

Northwestern Polytechnic’s Grande Prairie campus includes a 500-seat theatre and double gymnasium. Both are often used to host some of the community events in Grande Prairie. The campus' student lounge, Howlers, also hosts weekend and evening entertainment often arranged by the college’s Students' Association.

The campus also includes a bookstore, climbing gym, Tim Hortons and library with over 60,000 holdings.

Northwestern Polytechnic’s grounds have a view of the reservoir, and open onto Muskoseepi Park walking trails.

Northwestern Polytechnic’s Fairview Campus includes a theatre and gymnasium, both of which are frequent hosts to events organised by the college as well as community. There is a pool on campus that is jointly operated by the town and the college and is open to the public.

Residence
Northwestern Polytechnic has on-campus student residences in Fairview and Grande Prairie.  Student Village in Grande Prairie currently has space for over 500 students, while Fairview's residence houses approximately 300.

See also
List of agricultural universities and colleges
Education in Alberta
List of universities and colleges in Alberta

References

External links

GPRC Website
GPRC Wolves Athletics

Colleges in Alberta
Douglas Cardinal buildings
Grande Prairie